Sol Invictus Tour is the eighth concert tour by American rock band, Faith No More in support of their reunion album Sol Invictus. It began on April 15, 2015 in Vancouver, British Columbia and ended on October 25 of the same year in Sacramento, California.

Setlist
"Motherfucker"
"Be Aggressive"
"Evidence"
"Caffeine"
"Epic"
"Everything's Ruined"
"Black Friday"
"Cone of Shame"
"Midlife Crisis"
"The Gentle Art of Making Enemies"
"Easy" (Commodores cover)
"Separation Anxiety"
"King for a Day"
"Ashes to Ashes"
"Superhero"
Encore:
"Matador"
"Just a Man"
"We Care a Lot"

Tour dates

References

Faith No More concert tours
2015 concert tours